Prometheum is a genus of plants in the family Crassulaceae.

Taxonomy
The species in the genus Prometheum include:

 Prometheum pilosum (M.Bieb.) H.Ohba
 Prometheum sempervivoides (Fisch. ex M.Bieb.) H.Ohba
 Prometheum tymphaeum (Quézel & Contandr.) 't Hart

P. sempervivoides and P. pilosum were historically included in genera Sedum (section Cyprosedum), and later Rosularia, but were elevated to a separate genus by Ohba (1995).

Description
According to an experiment done on interspecific plant crosses in the family Crassulaceae, the genus Prometheum produced on average 55 seeds. Furthermore, the same experiment found that plants of the genus Prometheum formed a comparium with each other, meaning they were capable of interbreeding.

Distribution and habitat
From Anatolia to Iran, through the Caucasus.

References

Bibliography

 
 

Crassulaceae
Crassulaceae genera
Taxa named by Alwin Berger